Everlasting is the debut album of the Japanese pop rock group Every Little Thing, released on April 9, 1997.

Track listing
Unless otherwise stated, Mitsuru Igarashi wrote the lyrics, composed and arranged the music.

Charts

See also
 Feel My Heart
 Future World
 Dear My Friend

External links
 everlasting information at Avex Network.
 everlasting information at Oricon.
 everlasting information at Mora.jp (song length)

1997 debut albums
Every Little Thing (band) albums